The Honourable William Leslie (8 August 1751 – 3 January 1777) was a British nobleman and soldier. He was the second son of the Earl of Leven and Melville from Scotland and a captain in the 17th Foot of the British Army during the American War of Independence. He was mortally wounded during the Battle of Princeton and buried with military honours by American General George Washington at Pluckemin, New Jersey.

Early life 
Leslie was born on 8 August 1751 to David Leslie, 6th Earl of Leven and Wilhelmina Nisbet. He was the nephew of General Alexander Leslie.

During the summer of 1767, he became a friend of Benjamin Rush, who was then studying medicine at University of Edinburgh and had visited the estate of the Earl of Leven.

Military career 
In 1771, he joined the 42nd Highlanders; then switched to the 17th Foot and was promoted to lieutenant in 1773, and to captain in 1776. Sent to America in 1776, he served in the Battle of Long Island and the Battle of Fort Washington.

Leslie was one of many who died during the Battle of Princeton on 3 January 1777. The British put his body in a wagon that was later taken by the Americans. The following day his friend Benjamin Rush learned of Leslie's death from British Captain John McPherson while treating the wounded at Princeton. On Janunary 5th at Pluckemin, General George Washington ordered military honors for the burial when he learned Leslie was a friend of Rush. The gravestone is in the graveyard of the former St. Paul's Lutheran Church (built 1757), where the Pluckemin Presbyterian Church is now located.

Legacy 
In The Death of General Mercer at the Battle of Princeton, January 3, 1777, the painter John Trumbull displays several events of the battle. At the centre, General Hugh Mercer, with his dead horse beneath him, is mortally wounded. At the left, Captain Daniel Neil is bayoneted against a cannon. At the right, Leslie is shown mortally wounded. In the background, Washington and Rush enter the scene.

After the war, Dr. Benjamin Rush placed a gravestone in Leslie's memory at the Pluckemin graveyard. As the original had crumbled, a replacement with the same inscription was erected  by Professor Ogilby of Rutgers University at the request of David Leslie-Melville, 8th Earl of Leven. His gravestone is honoured by both British and Scottish flags.

Gallery

References

Bibliography

External links 
 
 

1751 births
1777 deaths
British Army personnel of the American Revolutionary War
Royal Leicestershire Regiment officers
British military personnel killed in the American Revolutionary War
Younger sons of earls
Burials in New Jersey